Kristian Hammer (born 20 March 1976 in Narvik, but grew up in Setermoen in Bardu) is a Norwegian nordic combined skier who has been competing since 1995 while representing Eidsvoll IL. He grew up on Setermoen in Bardu.

Hammer has three medals at the FIS Nordic World Ski Championships with two golds (4 x 5 km team: 2001, 2005) and one bronze (7.5 km sprint: 2005). His best individual finish at the Winter Olympics was 8th in the 15 km individual event at Salt Lake City in 2002.

Hammer has a total of eight individual victories in both 7.5 km sprint and 15 km individual from 1999 to 2001. He is currently the head coach of the Norwegian Nordic Combined national team.

External links 

Norwegian male Nordic combined skiers
Nordic combined skiers at the 1998 Winter Olympics
Nordic combined skiers at the 2002 Winter Olympics
Nordic combined skiers at the 2006 Winter Olympics
1976 births
Living people
Olympic Nordic combined skiers of Norway
People from Narvik
People from Bardu
FIS Nordic World Ski Championships medalists in Nordic combined
Sportspeople from Troms og Finnmark
21st-century Norwegian people